This article show all participating team squads at the Women's Olympic Volleyball Tournament at the 2000 Summer Olympics in Sydney, Australia.

Head Coach: Brad Saindon

Head Coach: Bernardo Rezende

Head Coach: Jin Hu

Head Coach: Ivica Jelic

Head Coach: Luis Felipe Calderon

Head Coach: Lee Hee-Wan

Head Coach: Angelo Frigoni

Head Coach: Sadatoshi Sugawara

Head Coach: Park Man-Bok

Head Coach: Nikolay Karpol

Head Coach: Kim Cheol-yong

Head Coach: Mick Haley

References

External links
Official Games reports - Volleyball (pgs. 27-28)

2000
2
Volleyball at the 2000 Summer Olympics
2000 in women's volleyball
Vol